Aaron Turner (born November 5, 1977) is an American musician, singer, graphic artist, and founder of label Hydra Head Records. He is most widely known for his role as guitarist and vocalist for the post-metal bands SUMAC and Isis, while also participating in several other bands and projects such as Old Man Gloom, Lotus Eaters and Split Cranium, a collaboration with Jussi Lehtisalo of Finnish band Circle who toured with Isis in 2009.

Raised in New Mexico, Turner moved to the Boston area, where he attended art school and formed Isis and Hydra Head. In June 2003, Turner moved operations of both the band and label to Los Angeles, California. Turner now resides in Vashon, WA which is also the base of operations for Hydra Head and his various other activities.

In partnership with his wife Faith Coloccia, Turner founded another record label, SIGE, in March 2011. It has gone on to release material from his musical collaboration with Coloccia, Mamiffer. SIGE is distributed by The Business.

Personal life 

Turner was born in Springfield, Massachusetts on November 5, 1977. At an early age, his family moved to New Mexico, where he was raised. His mother was a teacher "who taught a progressive curriculum" and his father an author, "mainly [of] non-fiction". Turner describes his upbringing, surrounded by his parents' writer, artist and photographer friends, as "creatively nurturing". At age 17, he started a company that sold rare punk rock records via mail-order. He later moved to Boston to attend art school at the School of the Museum of Fine Arts, and in 1995 began releasing music. By 1997, the Hydra Head label was becoming a respectable small record label. Turner describes his early industriousness as being motivated in part by boredom:

I grew up in New Mexico, and there wasn't a whole lot as far as youth culture is concerned. Especially when I started to get interested in straight edge and wasn't doing drugs anymore, there was really nothing for me to do. So that was like a big reason for me, I suppose, to become really productive. Also, I've never been a really social person. So there's not a lot of time taken up by my social life. And music has always been a very very big part of my life. I guess just a combination of those factors is why everything got started so early.

Around 1997–99, Turner was living with future Isis bassist and co-founder Jeff Caxide; until this point, he had been a member of the bands Union Suit and Hollomen. Isis was formed in 1997 out of a dissatisfaction with said bands' musical direction and Turner and Caxide's respective degrees of creative control.

In mid-2009, Turner moved from Los Angeles, where both Isis and Hydra Head Records were based at the time, to Seattle with his then-girlfriend, Faith Coloccia; they went on to wed in September of the same year.

Equipment 

Touring with Isis in 2007, Turner used two different guitars: a 1976 Fender Telecaster Custom (black), and a 1975 Fender Telecaster Deluxe (brown), played through various effects (his pedalboard layout changed every gig depending on what songs the band decided to play that night), a VHT/Fryette Pitbull Ultra Lead, and two 4x12 Sunn cabinets. He has also acquired a custom guitar from the Electrical Guitar Company (as did fellow Isis guitarist Michael Gallagher).

In the past, Turner has also used a Gibson Les Paul Standard, PRS CE24, and has played through Sunn, Mesa Boogie, and Mackie amplifiers.

When playing with Isis, Turner and his fellow guitarists usually tuned their instruments (low to high) B-F#-B-E-G#-B, to achieve a heavier sound. They also used other tunings, though less frequently, such as F# (octave below)-F#-B-E-G#-B.

In 2016, Turner described the live rig he used with SUMAC as consisting of two custom-built guitars from the Electrical Guitar Company.  Both have lucite bodies and aluminum necks, and custom-wound wide frequency range pickups.  The newer of the two—a prototype for a signature model—has a slightly flatter fingerboard radius than the older instrument. On a tour of the Eastern US, Turner was using an Orange Dual Dark 100 amplifier head with a slaved Fryette Two/Ninety/Two power amp.  Both heads drove Orange and Marshall cabinets, though Turner claimed to have no strong preferences for particular speaker cabinets. While recording, Turner prefers to use a Fryette Pitbull Ultra Lead, an amp model he's used consistently since his work in Isis. Turner described using a variety of effects pedals in his live rig.  Specifically, he runs a BOSS TU-3 Chromatic Tuner, a Death By Audio Apocalypse fuzz, a MASF fuzz, a Strymon BlueSky reverb (which he described as the one essential pedal in his rig), a TC Electronics Ditto Looper X2, and an EHX Forty-Five Thousand sampler (used to trigger preset samples during performance).  Turner prefers a Heil PR20 vocal microphone.
When playing with Sumac he uses two distinct tunings being A-F#-B-D-F#-B and A#-F-A#-D-F#-A#.

Musical influences 

Turner cites Pink Floyd, King Crimson, Godflesh, Neurosis, and Led Zeppelin as influences on Isis' sound.  However, he points to the electronica, krautrock and hip hop genres as shaping the group's rhythmic focus and use of sampling, as well as their occasional digressions into ambient passages. He has also listed Melvins, Jimi Hendrix, Swans, Keiji Haino, Oxbow, Earth, and Coil as among his favorite artists, and has noted that Megadeth, Metallica, and Slayer were important to his early interests in the guitar. In addition, he has noted Black Sabbath as an influence during his formative years.

Discography

Solo 

 Interminable Conniption (2019), The Tapeworm / Sige
 Repression's Blossom (2019), Sige
 The Occupation of Selfishness (Single) (2021)
 To Speak (2022), Trost

With Daniel Menche 

 NOX (2017), Sige

With Doolhof 

 Doolhof (2020), Sige

With Drawing Voices 

 Drawing Voices (2007), Hydra Head Records

With Greymachine 

 "Vultures Descend" (2009), Hydra Head Records
 Disconnected (2009), Hydra Head Records

With Hollomen 

 "Brand New Genius" [single] (1997), Hydra Head Records

With House of Low Culture

 Submarine Immersion Techniques Vol. 1 (2000),   Activities
Gettin' Sentimental EP (2002), Robotic Empire
 Edward's Lament (2003), Neurot Recordings
 Live from the House of Low Temperature! EP (2004), Hydra Head Records
 Chinatown Squalls EP (2007), En/Of
 Housing Tracts Compilation (2010), Sige
 Uncrossing / Ice Mole Split EP with Mamiffer (2010), Utech Records
 Lou Lou... In Tokyo Split with Mamiffer and Merzbow (2011), Sige
 Cloey / Spoiled Fruits of the Kingdom (Demo) Split EP with Mamiffer (2011), Sige
 Perverted Scripture / Silent Night Split EP with Mamiffer (2011), Sige
 Poisoned Soil (2011), Taiga Records/Sub Rosa
 Mamiffer + HOLC Split EP with Mamiffer (2013), Sige
 House of Low Culture / Caustic Touch / Daniel Menche / EMS Split (2017), Accident Prone
 Irretrievable (2020), Sige

With Isis

 Mosquito Control (1998), Escape Artist Records
 The Red Sea (1999), Second Nature Recordings
 Sawblade (1999), Tortuga Recordings
 Isis / Pig Destroyer (2000) (Split with Pig Destroyer), Relapse Records
 Celestial (2000), Escape Artist Records
 SGNL>05 (2001), Neurot Recordings
 Oceanic (2002), Ipecac Recordings
 Panopticon (2004), Ipecac Recordings
 In the Fishtank 14 (2006) collaboration with Aereogramme, Konkurrent
 In the Absence of Truth (2006), Ipecac Recordings
 Wavering Radiant (2009), Ipecac Recordings
 Melvins / Isis (2010) (Split with Melvins), Hydra Head Records

With Jodis 

 Secret House (2009), Hydra Head Records
 Black Curtain (2012), Hydra Head Records

With Jon Mueller 

 In the Falls (2021), Sige
 Now That You've Found It (2022), American Dreams Records

With Lotus Eaters 

 Alienist on a Pale Horse [EP] (2001), Double H Noise Industries
 Mind Control for Infants (2002), Neurot Recordings
 Lotus Eaters [EP] (2002), Drone Records
 Wurmwulv (2007), Troubleman Unlimited Records

With Mamiffer

 Hirror Enniffer (2008), Hydra Head Records
 Uncrossing / Ice Mole Split EP with House of Low Culture (2010), Utech Records
 Iron Road II / Fake Witch Split 12" with Oakeater (2011), Sige
 Lou Lou... In Tokyo Split with House of Low Culture and Merzbow (2011), Sige
 Perverted Scripture / Silent Night Split EP with House of Low Culture (2011), Sige
 Mare Decendrii (2011), Sige
 Bless Them That Curse You Collaboration LP with Locrian (2011), Sige
 Mamiffer / Pyramids Split LP with Pyramids (2012), Hydra Head Records
 Enharmonic Intervals (for Paschen organ) Collaboration LP with Circle (2013), Sige
 Statu Nascendi (2014), Sige
 Crater Collaboration LP with Daniel Menche (2015), Sige
 The World Unseen (2016), Sige
 Recordings For Lilac III limited cassette (2017), The Tapeworm
 The Brilliant Tabernacle (2019), Sige
 Ae/Be EP, (2020), Sige
 Mettapatterning for Constellation, (2020), Sige

With Marshall Trammell
 Experimental Love I & II (2020), Sige

With Old Man Gloom

 Meditations in B (1999), Tortuga Recordings
 Seminar II: The Holy Rites of Primitivism Regressionism (2001), Tortuga Recordings
 Seminar III: Zozobra (2001), Tortuga Recordings
 Christmas Eve I and II + 6 [EP] (2003), Tortuga Recordings
 Christmas (2004), Tortuga Recordings
 No (2012), Hydra Head Records
 The Ape of God (2014), Profound Lore
 Mickey Rookey Live at London (2016), Ektro Records
 Seminar IX: Darkness of Being (2020), Profound Lore
 Seminar VIII: Light of Meaning (2020), Profound Lore
 Willing Vessel / Storms in our Eyes [EP] (2020), Sige

With Pharaoh Overlord
 6 (2020), Rocket Recordings

With Split Cranium 
 Sceptres To Rust 7-inch (2012), Self Released
 Split Cranium (2012), Hydra Head
 I'm the Devil and I'm OK (2018), Ipecac Recordings

With Sumac
 The Deal (2015), Profound Lore
 What One Becomes (2016), Thrill Jockey
 Before You I Appear EP (2016), Thrill Jockey
 American Dollar Bill – Keep Facing Sideways, You're Too Hideous to Look at Face On with Keiji Haino (2018), Thrill Jockey
 Love in Shadow (2018), Thrill Jockey
 Even for Just the Briefest Moment Keep Charging This "Expiation" Plug in to Making It Slightly Better with Keiji Haino (2019), Trost
 May You Be Held (2020), Thrill Jockey
 Into This Juvenile Apocalypse Our Golden Blood to Pour Let Us Never  with Keiji Haino (2022), Thrill Jockey

With Summer of Seventeen
 Summer of Seventeen  (2020, Karlrecords)

With Tashi Dorji 
 Turn!Turn!Turn (2019), Sige

With Thalassa 

 Bonds of Prosperity (2017), Sige

With Twilight 

 Monument to Time End (2010), Southern Lord Records

With Unionsuit 

 Demo tape (1996), Hydra Head Records
 Accidents Happened [EP] (1997), Second Nature Recordings

As a guest contributor 

 27 – Let the Light in (2004), Hydra Head Records
 Turner contributes vocals to the track "April".
 Boris – Heavy Rocks (2011), Sargent House
 Turner contributes to the track "Aileron".
 Chelsea Wolfe – Hiss Spun (2017), Sargent House
 Guest vocals on the track "Vex"
 Converge – Converge / Napalm Death, self-released
 Guest on "Wolverine Blues" (originally performed by Entombed).
 Dekathlon – The Thin Road 7″ (2019), Ektro Records
 Guest vocals and guitar
 Full of Hell – Trumpeting Ecstasy (2017), Profound Lore Records
 Guest vocals on "Crawling Back To God"
 Lustmord – O T H E R (2008), Hydra Head Records
 Turner contributes guitar to the track "Element".
 Pelican – What We All Come to Need (2009), Southern Lord Records
 Turner contributes guest guitar to the title track.
 Puscifer – "V" Is for Viagra. The Remixes (2008), Puscifer Entertainment
 Turner provides the track "Trekka (The Great Unwashed Mix)".
 Samuel Kerridge – The I is Nothing (2018), Downwards Records
guest on "Propagates of Desire".
 Ringfinger – Decimal (2007), Little Black Cloud Records
 Turner contributes vocals and guitar to the track "Waving Good-Bye".
 Wolves in the Throne Room – Turner provides chants on "Subterranean Initiation" (2011)

Artwork 

Turner's artwork tends toward the abstract or surreal, often depicting strange or fantastic landscapes and structures.  His work on album covers, concert posters, and other music-related graphics is distinct from typical work in heavy metal or rock graphic design.  In part, this may be because of the way that Turner views his objectives in creating designs, which he has discussed on his blog in response to criticism of the clarity of text on one of his concert posters:

I also generally reject the idea that posters and album sleeves and T-shirts have to be marketing tools with overly obvious type/graphics, as opposed to more artistically oriented pieces that invoke the true spirit of the music they are intended to represent. if the bands being represented aren't writing 3 minute pop songs with inane choruses that beat the listener into submission, why should the representative graphics serve that purpose? i like to think the audience that follows these bands isn't the type of audience that requires overly simplified/commercial imagery and type in order to draw their attention to the "product". it is precisely the type of corporate design mentality as exemplified by the statement above that i have striven to avoid with what i do in the realm of music related graphics. we're not trying to sell our music to wal-mart shoppers, so if you expect our graphic personality to fall in line with what you were taught in design school about corporate branding and "truly effective" type and illustration techniques you shall be continually disappointed. clean type has its time and place, but this poster which is meant to showcase the personality of our label and by extension the show itself isn't it. music related design can be art simply beyond the idea of selling something...

In 2008, Turner's artwork was featured in a FIFTY24SF Gallery group show entitled Catalyst.
Turner has created album covers and liner note artwork for a variety of artists and bands, many of whom are signed to Hydra Head Records or Tortuga Recordings.

 27 – Let the Light In
 5ive – 5ive, Telestic Disfracture
 Aereogramme – Seclusion
 Agoraphobic Nosebleed – PCP Torpedo, Frozen Corpse Stuffed with Dope
 A Life Once Lost – The Fourth Plague: Flies
 Beecher – Breaking the Fourth Wall
 Bloodlet – Entheogen
 Burst – Prey on Life
 Cable – Northern Failures
 Cave In – Antenna, Planets of Old, White Silence
 Cavity – Laid Insignificant
 Clouds – We Are Above You
 Coalesce – There is Nothing New Under the Sun
 Converge – Petitioning the Empty Sky, When Forever Comes Crashing
 Craw – Bodies for Strontium 90
 The Dillinger Escape Plan – The Dillinger Escape Plan
 Drowningman – Drowningman Still Loves You
 The Dukes of Nothing – War & Wine
 Eugene Robinson – Fight
 Hematovore – Untitled
 The Hollomen – The Hollomen
 The Hope conspiracy – demo
 Isis – Mosquito Control, The Red Sea, Sawblade, Celestial, SGNL>05, Oceanic, Live.01, Panopticon, Live.02, Oceanic Remixes and Reinterpretations, Live.03, Live.04, Clearing the Eye, In the Absence of Truth, Shades of the Swarm, "Not in Rivers, but in Drops", Wavering Radiant, Isis / Melvins
 James Plotkin's Atomsmasher – Atomsmasher
 Jesu – Silver, Lifeline, Conqueror, Jesu, Why Are We Not Perfect?
 Jodis – Secret House
 Johnny Truant – The Repercussions of a Badly Planned Suicide
 KEN mode – Mongrel
 Kid Kilowatt – Guitar Method
 Knut – Terraformer, Wonder
 Mare – Self-Titled EP
 Milligram – Hello Motherfucker
 Mistle Thrush – Drunk with You
 Neurosis – Sovereign, Neurosis & Jarboe (remastered)
 Old Man Gloom – Meditations in B, Seminar II: The Holy Rites of Primitivism Regressionism, NO
 Panic – Dying For It
 Pelican – Australasia, The Fire in Our Throats Will Beckon the Thaw, City of Echoes
 Premonitions of War – Left in Kowloon
 Rosetta – The Galilean Satellites
 Torche – Meanderthal
 Tusk – Get Ready
 Xasthur – All Reflections Drained
 Zozobra – Harmonic Tremors, Bird of Prey''

References 
Footnotes

Citations

1977 births
Living people
Isis (band) members
American graphic designers
American heavy metal guitarists
American heavy metal singers
American experimental musicians
Shoegaze musicians
Guitarists from New Mexico
People from Santa Fe, New Mexico
American male guitarists
21st-century American singers
Old Man Gloom members
Twilight (band) members